Granatina is a genus of small seed-eating birds in the family Estrildidae that are found in Africa.

Taxonomy
The genus was introduced in 1890 by the English ornithologist Richard Bowdler Sharpe with the type species (by tautonomy) as the violet-eared waxbill (Fringilla granatina Linnaeus, 1766).

The two species now placed in this genus were formerly placed in Uraeginthus. The genus Granatina was resurrected based on a molecular phylogenetic study published in 2020 that found that these species were deeply divergent from the other species in Uraeginthus.

Species
The genus contains the following two species:

References

 
Bird genera
Waxbills